Candice Fox (born 1985) is an Australian novelist who won the 2014 Ned Kelly Award for Best First Novel for Hades. She was born in the western suburbs of Sydney into a large family. She spent a brief period in the Royal Australian Navy before studying and teaching at university level. In 2015, Candice started collaborating on a series of novels with bestselling author James Patterson.

Bibliography

Novels
 The Inn (2019) (collaboration with James Patterson)
 2 Sisters Detective Agency (2021) (collaboration with James Patterson)
 Gathering Dark (2020)
 The Chase (2021)

Archer  and Bennett 
 Hades (2014)
 Eden (2014)
 Fall (2015)

Detective Harriet Blue 
 Never Never (collaboration with James Patterson) (2016)
 Fifty Fifty (collaboration with James Patterson) (2017)
 Liar Liar (collaboration with James Patterson) (2018)
 Hush Hush (collaboration with James Patterson) (2019)

Crimson Lake 
 Crimson Lake (2017)
 Redemption Point (2018)
 Gone By Midnight (2019)

Novellas 
 Black and Blue (collaboration with James Patterson) (2016)

Adaptations 
Troppo (2022), an ABC TV/IMDb TV adaptation of Crimson Lake starring Thomas Jane and Nicole Chamoun premiered on February 27 in Australia and will premiere on May 20, 2022 in the United States. In March 2022 Gathering Dark was optioned for adaptation by Renegade Entertainment.

Awards 
 2015 shortlisted Davitt Award — Best Debut Crime Novel - Hades
 2014 winner Ned Kelly Awards for Crime Writing — Best First Novel - Hades
 2015 longlisted Davitt Award — Best Adult Crime Novel - Eden
 2015 winner Ned Kelly Awards for Crime Writing — Best Novel - Eden
 2016 shortlisted Ned Kelly Awards for Crime Writing — Best Novel - Fall
 2016 longlisted Davitt Award — Best Adult Crime Novel - Fall
 2017 shortlisted Ned Kelly Awards for Crime Writing — Best Novel - Crimson Lake
 2018 shortlisted Ned Kelly Awards for Crime Writing — Best Novel - Redemption Point
 2018 shortlisted listed Davitt Award — Best Adult Crime Novel - Crimson Lake
 2019 shortlisted Ned Kelly Awards for Crime Writing — Best Novel - Gone By Midnight
 2021 shortlisted Ned Kelly Awards for Crime Writing — Best Novel - Gathering Dark
 2021 shortlisted Davitt Award — Best Adult Crime Novel - Gathering Dark
 2022 shortlisted Ned Kelly Awards for Crime Writing — Best Novel - The Chase

References

External links
 Interview - "Author Candice Fox has a dark side" Australian Writers Centre
 Interview - "Meet Candice Fox, Author Of Hades" Backseat Clarity
 Official website

Living people
21st-century Australian novelists
Australian women novelists
Ned Kelly Award winners
21st-century Australian women writers
Australian crime fiction writers
1985 births